The Rainbow Bridge is a through truss bridge crossing the Neches River in Southeast Texas just upstream from Sabine Lake. It allows State Highway 87 and State Highway 73 to connect Port Arthur in Jefferson County on the southwest bank of the river. Bridge City in Orange County is on the northeast bank.

Construction
Construction on the bridge began in 1936 under the guidance of the Texas State Highway Department. Due to concerns by the upstream city of Beaumont about the bridge posing a threat to ship navigation, the Rainbow Bridge was built with a  main span. However, the height of the bridge did allow the construction of jack up offshore drilling rigs at the Bethlehem Beaumont Shipyard. With seventy-two rigs built, the shipyard was one of the major sources of offshore rigs built in the United States.

The bridge was completed on September 8, 1938. The nearby town of Prairie View took on the name "Bridge City" in response. Initially named the Port Arthur-Orange Bridge, it received its current name in 1957. The bridge was listed in the National Register of Historic Places in 1996.

Veterans Memorial Bridge
In 1988, construction began on the Veterans Memorial Bridge, a cable-stayed bridge. This bridge runs parallel to the Rainbow Bridge, and was dedicated on September 8, 1990.

After the completion of the Veterans Memorial Bridge, the Rainbow Bridge was closed for renovations. On its re-opening in 1997, the Rainbow Bridge became one way, handling westbound traffic only. The Veterans Memorial Bridge serves eastbound traffic.

See also

List of bridges documented by the Historic American Engineering Record in Texas
List of bridges on the National Register of Historic Places in Texas
National Register of Historic Places listings in Jefferson County, Texas

References

External links

Bridges completed in 1938
Bridges completed in 1990
Road bridges on the National Register of Historic Places in Texas
Buildings and structures in Jefferson County, Texas
Buildings and structures in Orange County, Texas
Cable-stayed bridges in the United States
Truss bridges in the United States
Historic American Engineering Record in Texas
Transportation in Jefferson County, Texas
Transportation in Orange County, Texas
National Register of Historic Places in Orange County, Texas
Steel bridges in the United States
1936 establishments in Texas
Public Works Administration in Texas